National Tertiary Route 506, or just Route 506 (or ) is a National Road Route of Costa Rica, located in the Heredia province.

Description
In Heredia province the route covers Sarapiquí canton (La Virgen district).

References

Highways in Costa Rica